Vice Admiral Frank Henderson 'Rammer' Pegram, CB, DSO, (25 February 1890 – 8 March 1944) was a British Royal Navy officer who played a prominent role in the Norwegian campaign during World War II who became Fourth Sea Lord and Chief of Naval Supplies and Transport.

Naval career
Pegram was born in Lancashire, England and joined the navy in 1905. He served in World War I aboard the predreadnought  and was present during the Gallipoli bombardment. In 1917 he served aboard the battlecruiser  and in 1918 he was Gunnery Officer aboard , a monitor bombarding German targets along the Belgian coast. For this service he received the Belgian Croix de guerre.

Between the wars Pegram had a number of shore and seagoing appointments, including a period as executive officer of the battleship .

As such, he saw active service in the battles surrounding the German invasion of Norway. The Glasgow was in the waters off Scandinavia early in the war and participated in the search for the German passenger liner . In February 1940, she captured the German trawler Herrlichkeit off Tromsø.

Pegram made three daring voyages into Norwegian ports with the threat of German air attack. The first was to land troops at Harstad in the far north of the country. Pegram then took the Glasgow into Namsos and landed a detachment of Royal Marines to block enemy troops until the main British forces arrived, during the Namsos Campaign. Finally, Pegram made a bold run under air attack into Molde in southern Norway to evacuate King Haakon VII, much of the Norwegian Cabinet and senior government leaders as well as a good portion of the gold reserves of Norway.

In May 1943 he was appointed Fourth Sea Lord and Chief of Naval Supplies and Transport until March 1944. He died in the Royal Naval Hospital in Bristol on 8 March 1944.

References

1890 births
1944 deaths
Royal Navy officers
Royal Navy officers of World War II
Royal Navy officers of World War I
Lords of the Admiralty
Military personnel from Lancashire
Companions of the Order of the Bath
Admiralty personnel of World War II